Trichaetoides borealis is a moth in the family Erebidae. It was described by Walter Rothschild in 1912. It is found on Borneo. The habitat consists of dry and wet heath forests and possibly swamp forests.

References

Moths described in 1912
Syntomini